The Appearing is a 2014 American supernatural horror film directed by Daric Gates and starring Will Wallace, Dean Cain, Don Swayze, Quinton Aaron, Emily Brooks and Wolfgang Bodison.

Cast
Will Wallace as Michael
Dean Cain as Dr. Shaw
Don Swayze as Sheriff Hendricks
Quinton Aaron as Kenneth
Emily Brooks as Rachel
Wolfgang Bodison as Father Callahan
Joe Estevez as Mental Man

Reception
Matt Molgaard of Horror Freak News wrote that the film "isn’t smooth, and it isn’t steady. It’s more like a wheelin’ session with your best buddy in his brand new, lifted truck. It’s everywhere. It’s dirty. And you never know when it may just roll right over, or get stuck in knee-high muck."

Lizzie Duncan of HorrorNews.net wrote that the film "is a fairly average film with no big scares in it and only a moderate twist at the end. It’s not terrible, but not too great either. Nothing was overtly ‘wrong’ with the film, but it could have been explored in a more coherent, gripping manner."

References

External links
 
 

2014 films
2014 horror films
2010s supernatural horror films
American supernatural horror films
2010s English-language films
2010s American films